The Lighthouse is the debut studio album by Australian singer-songwriter, Amity Dry. It was released in July 2003 following her appearance on The Block in 2003 alongside her husband. The album peaked at number 6 on the ARIA charts and was certified gold.

Track listing
 "Start of Something New" (David Nicholas, Michael Stangel) - 4:05
 "Walk Away" - 3:19
 "Breathe You in" - 3:43
 "Soul Cried" - 3:52
 "The Lighthouse" - 4:39
 "Wait Another Day" - 3:47
 "This Love - 4:19
 "Every Road" 4:19
 "One Wish" - 3:20
 "Love Like This" - 4:40
 all tracks written by Amity Dry unless noted

Charts

Certifications

References

2003 debut albums
Universal Music Australia albums
Pop albums by Australian artists